Polly Mellen (née Allen; born June 18, 1924) is an American stylist and retired fashion editor. For more than sixty years, she served as the fashion editor at Harper's Bazaar and Vogue. From 1991 to 1999 she was the creative director of Allure. Mellen formally retired from Conde Nast Publications in 1994 and remains a consultant on various projects.

Personal life and education
She was born on June 18, 1924. and raised in West Hartford, Connecticut, and attended Miss Porter's School. Mellen was married to Henry Wigglesworth Mellen from 1965 until his death in 2014. Before she started her career in design, she worked as a nurse's aide in World War II.

Career
Mellen's career began as the protégée of Diana Vreeland. Her start in the fashion was with Lord & Taylor as a salesgirl and display designer. Under Vreeland's tutelage, Mellen became an editor at Harper's Bazaar, and later at American Vogue. In the course of her career, Mellen has collaborated with such photographers as Richard Avedon, Helmut Newton, and Irving Penn. Richard Avedon said of her: "She was and still is the most creative sittings editor I ever worked with." Mellen has been known for her enthusiastic support of certain young designers both in the personal and business aspects of their lives. "She’s never lost her enthusiasm, in a field where everyone seems so jaded," says Isaac Mizrahi.

Mellen has appeared in a number of documentaries on the fashion industry including Unzipped and Catwalk (both 1995) and HBO's In Vogue: The Editor's Eye (2012).   In 2001 she won the CFDA Lifetime Achievement award.

References

American women journalists
Living people
Miss Porter's School alumni
Fashion editors
People from West Hartford, Connecticut
World War II nurses
21st-century American women
1924 births